The Vera Rubin Early Career Prize  is named after Vera Rubin and is given by the Division on Dynamical Astronomy of the American Astronomical Society. The prize recognizes excellence in Dynamical Astronomy. Recipients must have received their doctorate no more than ten years prior.

Winners

See also

 List of astronomy awards

References

Astronomy prizes
American Astronomical Society